Shanan Luke Stewart (born 21 June 1982) is a former New Zealand cricketer who played 4 ODIs and Canterbury in domestic cricket. He is a right-handed batsman and represented New Zealand A during the Top End tour. He has recently re-signed for East Lancs CC for a second season after a good first season. He was born in Christchurch.

He was called up to the BlackCaps for the Australian Tour in the One Day Format, due to injuries to James Franklin and Ross Taylor.

In the 2009-10 season he and Kruger van Wyk added 379* for Canterbury to record the highest sixth wicket partnership in New Zealand first-class cricket.

Stewart retired from all cricket in 2014.

References

External links
Cricinfo profile
 
Shanan Stewart Interview

1982 births
Living people
New Zealand cricketers
New Zealand One Day International cricketers
Canterbury cricketers